Tony Millionaire (born Scott Richardson in 1956) is an American cartoonist, illustrator and author known for his syndicated comic strip Maakies and the Sock Monkey series of comics and picture books. He lives in Yarmouth, Maine at Pleasant St. Studios with artist and educator Kat Gillies.

Early life
Millionaire grew up in and around the seaside town of Gloucester, Massachusetts. He came from a family of artists – his father was a commercial illustrator, his mother and grandparents were painters – and was encouraged to draw from an early age. His grandfather, who was a friend of the cartoonist Roy Crane, had a large collection of old Sunday comics, which were an early source of inspiration to Millionaire. He drew his first comic strip, "about an egg-shaped superhero who flew around talking about how great he was and then crashing into a cliff," when he was nine years old.  During high school, Millionaire continued to draw comic strips for his own amusement.

Career
After high school, Millionaire attended the Massachusetts College of Art, where he majored in painting. While in college, he began drawing houses for money; this, along with occasional illustration jobs, would be his primary source of income for the next 20 years. After graduating from college, he moved from place to place, living in Boston; Florida; California; and Italy; before settling in Berlin for five years during the 1980s. Returning to the U.S. in the early '90s, he moved to Brooklyn, where he began drawing a regular comic strip, Medea's Weekend, for the Williamsburg newsweekly Waterfront Week.

One night at a local bar, the Six Twelve, Millionaire drew "a cartoon about a little bird who drank booze and blew his brains out" on a napkin – the origin of his best-known character, Drinky Crow. The bartender encouraged him to draw more cartoons, offering him a free beer for each one he completed. After doing many of these cocktail napkin drawings, Millionaire began drawing more polished versions of his cartoons for publication in various zines, including Spike Vrusho's Murtaugh and Selwyn Harris's HappyLand. He also did drawings for several trade journals and Al Goldstein's notorious tabloid Screw. Eventually the alternative newsweekly New York Press asked him to draw a weekly strip, and in 1994, Maakies debuted in its pages. It soon spread to other papers across the country. During the mid-2000s, Millionaire transferred Maakies to The Village Voice as its NYC venue, but returned it to the New York Press in February 2007.

Besides Maakies, Millionaire has produced a series of comics and picture books, collectively titled Sock Monkey. He has also occasionally contributed to comics anthologies including Legal Action Comics, Star Wars Tales,  Marvel's Strange Tales, Dirty Stories, and Bizarro Comics. His illustrations are published in many leading venues including The New York Times, The New Yorker and The Wall Street Journal. Currently, he does much of the artwork, along with Charles Burns, for Dave Eggers' magazine The Believer. Animated versions of his work have been featured on Saturday Night Live, in the They Might Be Giants documentary Gigantic, and on Adult Swim. In 2006, Fantagraphics Books published his graphic novel Billy Hazelnuts. He is working on a children's book to be published by Hyperion. Since February 10, 2010, Millionaire's comic Maakies has been published weekly in Nib-Lit.

Style and influences
Millionaire draws in a lush style that mingles naturalistic detail with strong doses of the fanciful and grotesque. His linework resembles that of Johnny Gruelle, whom he cites as one of his main sources of inspiration, along with Ernest Shepard and "all those freaks from the twenties and thirties who did the newspaper strips"; many of Millionaire's admirers adduce a similarity to the work of E. C. Segar in particular. He draws with a fountain pen.

The nautical settings of much of Millionaire's work draw inspiration from his childhood memories of his grandparents' artwork and seaside home, as well as the novels of Patrick O'Brian, of which he is an avid reader.

Pseudonym
When asked in interviews why he uses a pen name, Millionaire maintains that he does not, and that "Tony Millionaire" is his real name: "It is my legal name, and it's been around a lot longer than I've been a cartoonist." He has said his unusual surname is an Old French word meaning "a person who owns a thousand serfs," but the origin of the name "Tony Millionaire" is a character in an episode of the 1960s TV series I Dream of Jeannie.

Millionaire has speculated that in the future he may publish some family-friendly works of his under a different moniker, in order to dissociate them from his other, more ribald output.

Millionaire's actual name is Scott Richardson.

Filmography

Adult Swim Presents The Drinky Crow Show (2007–2009) (Creator, Actor, Executive Producer)
Fun with God (2009) (Actor in the titular role)
Goil Trouble (2010) (Actor)

See also
 God Hates Cartoons

References

External links
 Maakies.com
 
 Audio interview with Millionaire on public radio program The Sound of Young America
 February 2005 Interview by Coury Turczyn from g4TV.com
 April 2002 Interview from freewilliamsburg.com
 Interview by Logan Kaufman from Adventures Underground
 Interview from darkhorse.com
 "Who wants to be Tony Millionaire?" by Mike Miliard, The Boston Phoenix, April 12, 2006
 Interview with Chief Magazine
 Interview on WTF w/ Marc Maron Podcast, July 5, 2012

1956 births
Artists from Boston
Living people
American graphic novelists
American comic strip cartoonists
Massachusetts College of Art and Design alumni
New York Press people
Eisner Award winners for Talent Deserving of Wider Recognition
Eisner Award winners for Best Writer/Artist
Ignatz Award winners for Outstanding Artist
American male novelists
Novelists from New York (state)
The Believer (magazine) people